Marie of Lusignan or Marie I de Lusignan (died in Poitou, 1 October 1260; buried at the Abbey of Foucarmont), was the only child of Raoul II of Lusignan and his second wife, Yolande de Dreux. She became Dame d'Exoudun, Countess of Eu on the death of her father in 1246.

She was married around 1249 to Alphonso of Brienne who became Count of Eu by this marriage.

Marie and Alphonso had at least two children:
 John I of Brienne, Count of Eu
 Blanche, Abbess of Maubuisson

References

Sources

1260 deaths
House of Brienne
House of Lusignan
Eu, Countess of, Marie of Lusignan
13th-century women rulers
Counts of Eu